Roland Fomundam is a Cameroonian entrepreneur who is known for Greenhouse Ventures, a development of organic farming with new technologies to provide lasting solutions to Africa's agricultural sector. In 2007 he founded Youth Action Africa, a platform which promotes technology development. In 2016, he was nominated amongst 50 most Influential Young Cameroonians by Advance Media  CELBMD Africa and partners in the business category. In 2017 he was again nominated in the same category by Advance Media CELBMD.

Early life
Fomundam is a native of Ku Momo Northwest Region (Cameroon). He studied at Northeastern University in the United States.

Career
Fomundam is the founder and CEO of Greenhouse Ventures Ltd. He started his professional career in 2007. He has launched three companies in a bid to enhance the agricultural sector in Africa to be more profitable. His contributions to the development of agricultural sector in Africa earned him two nominations in 2016 and 2017 by Advance Media CELBMD Africa and partners in the category of business.

Awards and recognition

See also 
List of Cameroonians
Media of Cameroon

References

External links
 http://greenhouseventures.org

1982 births
Cameroonian businesspeople
Living people